Unicon, previously known as UNICON, is the World Unicycling Convention and Championships sanctioned by the International Unicycling Federation (IUF).

The IUF sanctions a biennial world unicycling convention and competition, the major event on the international unicycling calendar. Events include artistic (such as group, pairs, individual), track racing (such as 100 metres, 400 metres, 800 metres, 30 metres walk the wheel, 50 metres one-foot), road races (such as 10 kilometres, marathon), stillstand, slalom, muni (cross-country, uphill, downhill), street, trials, flatland, basketball and hockey.

List of Unicons

Unicon XIX records 
At Unicon 19 in Ansan, Korea, a new record was set by Mike Taylor in the Platform High Jump. Mike successfully landed the high jump of 148.5cm.

External links
 International Unicycling Federation

References

Unicycling
Conventions (meetings)